Galiveedu is a village in Annamayya district of the Indian state of Andhra Pradesh. It is located in Galiveedu mandal of Rayachoti revenue division.

Geography
It has an average elevation of 403 meters (1325 feet).

References 

Villages in Annamayya district